Coalbrook is a village in the Slieveardagh Hills in County Tipperary.

Lisnamrock National School educates the children of Coalbrook and the surrounding townlands.

Gallery

See also
 List of towns in the Republic of Ireland

References

External links
 Lisnamrock National School
 Coalbrook House - Buildings of Ireland

Towns and villages in County Tipperary